Liebe, Tod & Teufel (Love, Death & the Devil) is a 1987 album by the Austrian pop band Erste Allgemeine Verunsicherung.

Background
After the great success of Geld oder Leben! (Your Money or Your Life!) and its singles, the band was working on a new album. Liebe, Tod & Teufel was released on 26 October 1987. The single Küss die Hand, schöne Frau was released on 17 October that year. In 1988, the singles An der Copacabana and Burli were released. On 18 February 1988, the band started touring to promote the album.

Track list

Personnel

Contents
The cover of the album shows a penguin who is popular amongst women. It also features "Teil 1" (Part 1) on the cover, with Verunsicherung from their name in big red letters adorning the cover (Erste Allgemeine appear below in brackets). This is an illustration of the song Küss die Hand, schöne Frau. In Liebe, Tod und Teufel the attitude of the Catholic Church against AIDS and homosexuals is attacked, while Burli contains a biting satire of nuclear power. However, some songs poke fun at Prince Charles' large ears (Ohr-Troubles).

Reception
The album reached #1 in Austria and Switzerland, for eight and two weeks respectively. It peaked at #3 in Germany.

Charts

Weekly charts

Year-end charts

References

1987 albums
Erste Allgemeine Verunsicherung albums